Ogoudou is a town in southern Ivory Coast. It is a sub-prefecture of Divo Department in Lôh-Djiboua Region, Gôh-Djiboua District.

Ogoudou was a commune until March 2012, when it became one of 1126 communes nationwide that were abolished.

In 2021, the population of the sub-prefecture of Ogoudou was 72,586.

Villages

The 9 villages of the sub-prefecture of Ogoudou and their population in 2014 are:

 Ahouanou 2 (1 871)
 Béhiri (1 534)
 Blé (2 994)
 Djékouamékro (2 588)
 Hermankono-Garo (14 216)
 Kouamékro (5 653)
 Obié (3 827)
 Ogoudou (14 779)
 Sakota (904)

References

Sub-prefectures of Lôh-Djiboua
Former communes of Ivory Coast